The Quarterly Review of Film and Video is a peer-reviewed academic journal covering moving image studies, considered to be among the best-known journals in this field. It is published by Routledge. From 1999 to 2014, Wheeler Winston Dixon and Gwendolyn Audrey Foster were the editors-in-chief of the journal; on December 23, 2014 David Sterritt became the new editor of the journal.

History 
The founding editor was Ronald Gottesman, who began the journal in the middle 1970s. Later editors have included Katherine S. Kovács and Michael Renov. The journal was established in 1976 as the Quarterly Review of Film Studies, obtaining its current title in 1989. It was one of a few journals in the early 21st century which published critical essays about controversial topics.

Scope 
The journal covers film history, theory, production, and reception of film, film criticism, video games and installations from various perspectives.

Abstracting and indexing 
The journal is abstracted and indexed in:

See also
 List of film periodicals

References

External links 
 

Film studies journals
Taylor & Francis academic journals
Publications established in 1976
English-language journals